The Barak River flows  through the states of Manipur, Nagaland, Mizoram and Assam in India. Further it enters Bangladesh where it bifurcates into the Surma river and the Kushiyara river which converges again to become the Meghna river before forming the Ganges Delta with the Ganga and the Brahmaputra rivers and flowing into the Bay of Bengal. Of its length  is in India,  on the Indo–Bangladesh border and the rest is in Bangladesh. The upper part of its navigable part is in India —  between Lakhipur and Bhanga, declared as National Waterway 6, (NW-6) since the year 2016. The water and banks host or are visited by a wide variety of flora and fauna.

The principal tributaries are all in India: the Sonai (or Tuirial), the Jiri, the Tlawng (or Dhaleswari, or Katakal), the Jatinga, the Longai and the Madhura.

Tipaimukh Dam is a proposed dam on the river itself.

Sources

From its source at Liyai Kullen Village in Manipur state where most people are of the Poumai Naga tribe, the river is known as Vourei. Near its source, the river receives streams such as the Vehrei originating from Phuba Village, the Gumti, Howrah, Kagni, Senai Buri, Hari Mangal, Kakrai, Kurulia, Balujhuri, Shonaichhari and Durduria.

It flows west in Manipur, and borders Nagaland, then southwest to Assam where it leaves India and enters Bangladesh at Bhanga Bazar.

Main tributaries
The local rainfall run off of the valley along with that of adjacent hilly areas flows through river Barak and its various tributaries and is drained out to Bangladesh. The Katakhal, Jiri, Chiri, Modhura, Longai, Sonai, Rukni and Singla are the main tributaries of the valley. The tributaries are mainly rain-fed and cause flood problems when precipitation occurs. The Barak sub-basin drains areas in India, Bangladesh and Burma. The drainage area lying in India is 41723 km2 which is nearly 1.38% of the total geographical area of the country. It is on the north by the Barail range separating it from the Brahmaputra sub-basin, on the east by the Na Lushai hills and on the south and west by Bangladesh. The sub-basin lies in the States of Meghalaya, Manipur, Mizoram, Assam, Tripura and Nagaland.

In Manipur, in its flow south-west to Tipaimukh, it is joined by the Tuivai, and then flows northward to Jirimukh where it is joined by the Jiri river from the north. From here the flow is westward into Cachar, then Karimganj District of Assam, then to Sylhet in Bangladesh having a co-distributary the Surma River, the other later becoming the Meghna before the Ganga-Brahmaputra delta. The Padma joins it to become the Meghna.

Wildlife 
The Barak is among the richest rivers in the world as to aquatic biodiversity, as it contains more than 2,000 species of fish. Other creatures include River Barak or Siamese crocodile (a rare and endangered crocodilian), the susu dolphin, smooth-coated otter and black mugger crocodile. The biomes are extremely rich in wildlife and also very diverse in the entire stretch of the river including: 
Varzea forest (flooded rainforest) 
Los llamjao (flooded grassland and Savannah)
Tidal forest (mangroves in vast Delta Avourei)
Flora or vegetation of the Pats (flat-topped table mountains in India and western Cambodia)
Very large tropical swamps.

Environmental concerns 
Environmentalists have expressed concern over the way aquatic creatures and their habitats are being destroyed in the upper reaches of river in southern Assam. Prominent nature conservation NGO Society for Activists for Forest and Environment (SAFE) has pointed out that the tribals living on both banks of Barak have developed the harmful practice of blasting small gelatin sticks smuggled from Mizoram to kill fish. In the process, thousands of fish, young and mature, along with turtles, dolphins and other aquatic life organisms are killed.

The Ganges river dolphin is endangered. The proposed Tipaimukh Dam on the river in northeast India – a political controversy between India and Bangladesh – could hasten its extinction, researchers warn. Making a plea for conservation, researchers from Assam state in a study that the dolphin, India's national aquatic animal is heading towards “local extinction” in the river system of the state. “Factors like poaching (for oil and meat) and accidental mortalities in fishing gear, gradual habitat degradation by sluice gates, embankments, disturbances like motorboats and aquatic pollution have resulted in the extirpation of the resident dolphin population from the Barak river system of Assam,” M.K. Mazumder, corresponding author of the study, wrote.

See also

 List of rivers of India
 List of rivers of Bangladesh

References

External links
 

Rivers of Assam
Rivers of Manipur
Rivers of Mizoram
Rivers of India
Rivers of Bangladesh
Bangladesh–India border
International rivers of Asia
Border rivers